Overseas Press Club - Exclusive! is a British adventure anthology television series which first aired on ITV in 1957. Each episode featured a different story based on a purportedly real case involving foreign correspondents of the Overseas Press Club. It was shot at ABPC's Elstree Studios.

Actors who appeared on the show included Ralph Bellamy, Phyllis Calvert, Faith Domergue, Nicole Maurey, Claude Dauphin, Kieron Moore, Eric Pohlmann, John Laurie, Leonard Sachs, Ferdy Mayne, Stratford Johns, Lee Montague, Peter Wyngarde, Anton Diffring, Julia Arnall, André Morell, Stanley Meadows, Jack MacGowran, Helen Haye, Betty McDowall, Alan Tilvern, Austin Trevor, Nigel Stock and Lloyd Lamble.

References

Bibliography

External links
 

ITV television dramas
1957 British television series debuts
1950s British drama television series
English-language television shows
Television shows shot at Associated British Studios